Archilochian or archilochean is a term used in the metrical analysis of Ancient Greek and Latin poetry.  The name is derived from Archilochus, whose poetry first uses the rhythms.

In Greek verse
In the analysis of Archaic and Classical Greek poetry, archilochian usually describes the length x – u u – u u – x – u – u – – (where "–" indicates a longum, "u" a breve, and "x" an anceps syllable).  The alternative name erasmonideus comes from Archilochus' fr. 168 West:
Ἐρασμονίδη Χαρίλαε, | χρῆμά τοι γελοῖον 
ἐρέω, πολὺ φίλταθ᾽ ἑταίρων, | τέρψεαι δ᾽ ἀκούων.
As indicated, a caesura is observed before the ithyphallic (– u – u – –) ending of the verse.  (Because of this, the name erasmonideus has sometimes been used to refer only to the colon x – u u – u u – x preceding the ithyphallic.)

The verse is also used stichically in Old Comedy, for example in Aristophanes, Wasps 1518-1537 (with irregular responsion) and in Cratinus fr. 360 Kassel-Austin, where, as Hephaestion notes, no caesura is observed before the ithyphallic ending:
Χαῖρ᾽, ὦ μέγ᾽ ἀχρειόγελως ὅμιλε, ταῖς ἐπίβδαις, 
τῆς ἡμετέρας σοφίας κριτὴς ἄριστε πάντων, 
εὐδαίμον᾽ ἔτικτέ σε μήτηρ ἰκρίων ψόφησις. 

The verse also occurs in the choral lyric of tragedy and comedy, with the same caesura as in the example from Archilochus, as a rule.

Trichas used the name archilocheion for the trochaic trimeter catalectic, – u – x  – u – x  – u –, seen in Archilochus, fr. 197 West, and used stichically by Callimachus (fr. 202 Pfeiffer).

In Latin verse
In discussion of Horace's poetry, the Greater Archilochian verse (or Archilochian heptameter) consists of four dactyls (or alternatively spondees) followed after a caesura by three trochees, producing the seven-foot scheme – u u  – u u  – u u  – u u | – u  – u  – –, as in the first line of Horace's Odes 1.4:
Solvitur acris hiems grātā vice | vēris et Favōni.

As in that ode, Archilochian verses were usually used in distichs with the iambic trimeter catalectic, in which a caesura marked off the identical ending rhythm of the two verses (the trochaic tripody):
Solvitur acris hiems grata vice | veris et Favoni
trahuntque siccas | machinae carinas,
ac neque iam stabulis gaudet pecus | aut arator igni
nec prata canis | albicant pruinis.

The distich's name reflects the precedent in Archilochus (for example, fr. 188 West).

The name archilochian is also applied to similar combinations of dactylic and trochaic rhythms elsewhere in Horace (Epodes 15, 16, cf. Archilochus fr. 193 West; Epode 11, cf. Archilochus fr. 196 West).

The minor archilochian is equivalent to the hemiepes.

Notes

Types of verses
Ancient Greek poetry